Paul Sanasardo (born 15 September 1928) is an American dancer, choreographer and dance teacher of Italian descent.

Life and career
Paul Sanasardo was born in Chicago, Illinois to a Sicilian family from Palermo, Italy. He attended the School of the Art Institute of Chicago, studied dance with Antony Tudor and Martha Graham, and made his debut in 1952 with the Erika Thimey Dance Theater. In 1955 he performed with Anna Sokolow and in 1957 and 1964 with Pearl Lang. He also danced with New York City Opera and in musicals on Broadway.

Sanasardo founded the Paul Sanasardo-Donya Feuer Dance Company in 1957 and the Studio for Dance  school (later Modern Dance Artists Inc.) in 1958. He served as the artistic director of the Batsheva Dance Company from 1977-81.From 1981 till disbanding his company in 1986,he ran a second story dance studio on 21st street. After disbanding his company he continued choreographing and teaching. His works continue to be performed by several companies, including Alvin Ailey American Dance Theater.

Works
Selected works include:
Fatal Birds (1966)
Pain
The Path
Bells
Shadows
Consort for Dancers
Children in the Mist
Cyclometry (1971)
The Seven Last Words (music by Kancheli, 1994)
Sleepless Nights in the City
Abandoned Prayer
Metallics

References

External links

1928 births
Living people
American choreographers
Artists from Chicago
American male ballet dancers